George Elliott (born 1991) is an English rugby league footballer currently playing for the York City Knights in the Co-operative Championship. Elliott originally played Rugby union for Leeds Carnegie and played for England U16s and U18s, as well as playing for England U16 and U18 at rugby league. Elliott signed a dual code contract where he played for both Leeds Carnegie and Leeds Rhinos academies. He made his début for the Leeds Rhinos in 2011 with a win over Crusaders RL.

References

External links
Statistics at rugbyleagueproject.org

1991 births
Living people
English rugby league players
English rugby union players
Leeds Rhinos players
York City Knights players
Rugby articles needing expert attention
Rugby league players from Yorkshire
Rugby union players from Yorkshire